Rockstar (stylized as ROCKST★R or ЯR) is an energy drink created in 2001, which, has a 0.3% market share of the US non-alcoholic beverage market. Rockstar is based in Purchase, New York. , Rockstar Energy Drink was available in more than 20 flavors and in more than 30 countries. In March 2020, PepsiCo announced it had agreed to acquire Rockstar for $3.85 billion.

History
Founded in 2001 by Russ Weiner, the son of right-wing radio show host Michael Savage. Rockstar launched into what was the fastest-growing segment of the U.S. beverage market at the time, energy drinks. In addition to featuring different ingredients, which it claimed were "scientifically formulated to speed the recovery time of those who lead active and exhausting lifestyles—from athletes to rock stars," Rockstar sought to differentiate itself from the market leader, Red Bull, by using a 16 oz can size as opposed to Red Bull's 8 oz can, and by marketing itself as "twice the size of Red Bull for the same price"

By 2007, Rockstar was one of the top three energy drink brands in North America, with a 155% growth in sales in 2004, reaching $48 million" Atlanta Journal-Constitution and had sold over a billion cans. It had 14% of the US energy drink market in 2008, and as of 2009 was available in over 20 countries, . Among those countries are Sold: in the United States, Canada, the United Kingdom, Ireland, Germany, Spain, Japan, Hong Kong, Australia, Mexico, Malta, New Zealand, Argentina, the Netherlands, Finland, Morocco and Colombia. Rockstar switched distributors from The Coca-Cola Company to PepsiCo in the summer of 2009.

Production and distribution for the United Kingdom and Republic of Ireland was franchised to Irn Bru owners A.G. Barr until 2027, though this was terminated in 2020 following the PepsiCo acquisition.

In 2020, PepsiCo acquired Rockstar Energy for $3.85 billion.

Boycott
Members of the LGBT community have supported a boycott because the company's founder and chief executive officer is the son of right-wing radio personality Michael Savage and because its former chief financial officer, Janet Weiner, is Savage's wife and CFO of his production company. The boycott was motivated by allegations that Savage had made homophobic, racist, antisemitic, and discriminatory comments. In May 2009, San Francisco mayor Gavin Newsom returned a $25,000 donation which Rockstar had made to his 2010 re-election campaign.

During an interview with the San Francisco Chronicle, Newsom aide Eric Jaye stated the money was returned because "there was some statements made during (Weiner's) 1998 campaign in the GOP primary which conflicted with the mayor's position and we're returning the check," he said.

In a later interview Weiner told SF Gate: "I still wish Gavin well. I always will." But he said that with the donation rejected, "I'm taking this money and I'm donating it to charity. We're telling them to name a charity of their choosing, and if they don't want it, we'll donate it to Project Open Hand."

Janet Weiner stepped down from her role as CFO of Savage Productions "as an apparent statement of solidarity with equality advocates" which had not been requested as part of the agreement.

Rockstar, saying that the "truthaboutrockstarenergydrink.com" domain name was registered and used in bad faith, obtained control of that site under a decision from the National Arbitration Forum.

Contents
Rockstar products in the US have two levels of caffeine content: either 10 mg of caffeine per ounce, or 15 mg of caffeine per ounce. Rockstar Energy Drink Original contains 160 mg of caffeine per 16 ounce can, while the Rockstar Punched and Pure Zero energy drinks contain 240 mg of caffeine per 16 ounce can.

Besides caffeine and sugar, Rockstar Energy Drink contains a variety of herbs, including panax ginseng, ginkgo biloba, milk thistle extract, and guarana seed. The amount of guarana used to be higher, but "after being criticized for including guarana once health concerns about the herb were publicized, the amount in the drink was significantly reduced". It also includes 1000 mg of taurine.

Side effects
Rockstar can cause jitteriness and anxiety. Sugar may be present, which could cause high blood sugar levels. If mixed with alcohol, it may also mask the level of alcohol intoxication. There are no known side effects if used in moderation.
Several alcoholic versions of Rockstar are available in Canada; an alcoholic version in the US was discontinued in 2007, possibly in response to criticism that young people were confusing the alcoholic version with the regular one.

Rockstar Original was named Worst Energy Drink by Men's Health magazine for having 280 calories due to 67.5 grams of sugar. Monster Energy Lo-Carb, with 20 calories, was suggested as a replacement.

Rockstar has introduced a line of low calorie energy drinks that include electrolytes called Rockstar Recovery, partially in response to these concerns.

Sponsorship

Like its competitors Red Bull and Monster Energy, Rockstar sponsors a range of action sports and music events, including the Mayhem Festival, a metal and rock festival touring the United States in July and August; the Uproar Festival, a rock festival touring the United States in September and October; and the Lucas Oil Off Road Racing Series. Both the Mayhem and Uproar events were discontinued in 2015.

Rockstar also sponsors a large number of action sports competitors, such as the Husqvarna factory motorcycle riders Gautier Paulin, Graham Jarvis and Pablo Quintanilla, motorcycle road racer Jorge Lorenzo (2011-2012), flat track rider Bryan Smith, rallycross drivers Tanner Foust and Scott Speed, off-road truck driver Rob MacCachren, and drifters Fredric Aasbø and Ryan Tuerck.

See also 
 Arizona Iced Tea

References

External links
 

Companies based in Spring Valley, Nevada
Energy drinks
Food and drink introduced in 2001
2020 mergers and acquisitions
PepsiCo soft drinks